Rose Marie Antoinette Blommers-Schlösser (Eindhoven, 1944) is a Dutch herpetologist and entomologist.

Life and research 
Blommers-Schlösser conducted her PhD at the University of Amsterdam on the systematics of the frogs of Madagascar. Together with numerous other herpetologists, especially Charles P. Blanc, she described numerous species of frogs from Madagascar, including Mantidactylus spiniferus, Boophis reticulatus, Spinomantis guibei, and Guibemantis punctatus, and contributed extensively to the knowledge of these and other species. She contributed particularly significantly to understanding of the reproductive behaviour of numerous microhylids from Madagascar, and supraspecific taxonomy of the Mantellidae. She also contributed to the literature on the karyotypes of phytoseiid mites of Madagascar in 1975.

Matronyms 
The frog genus Blommersia, and the species Blommersia blommersae and Boophis blommersae, were named in honour of Blommers-Schlösser, in recognition of her contributions to the herpetology of Madagascar.

References 

1944 births
Living people
Dutch herpetologists
Women herpetologists
Dutch entomologists
Women entomologists
People from Eindhoven
20th-century Dutch women scientists
University of Amsterdam alumni